Joinville-le-Pont is a railway station in the French commune of Joinville-le-Pont, Val-de-Marne, a southeastern suburb of Paris.

History
Joinville-le-Pont station opened in its current form on 14 December 1969 as part of the initial segment of the RER network with service between Nation in central Paris and Boissy-Saint-Léger.

Service

Joinville-le-Pont is on the A2 branch of the RER A and receives frequent service westbound to Saint-Germain-en-Laye on the A1 branch and Boissy-Saint-Léger eastbound on the A2 branch. At peak times there are up to twelve trains per hour (one train every five minutes), during off-peak hours trains arrive every ten minutes, and early mornings and late nights trains come at fifteen-minute intervals.

Bus connections
The station is served by several buses:
  Noctilien network night bus line: .

References

J
J
J
J